The World RX of Finland is a Rallycross event held in Finland for the FIA World Rallycross Championship. The event made its debut in the 2014 season, at the Tykkimäki amusement park in the town of Kouvola. 

In June 2020, an extraordinary World Motor Sport Council added an event in Kouvola (Finland) to replace the World RX of France as it was cancelled, due to the COVID-19 pandemic. The event was a double-header

Past winners

References

Finland
Auto races in Finland